The Amantini was the name of a Pannonian Illyrian tribe. 

The Amantini lived between the rivers Drava and Sava close to Sirmium . They remained outside the Roman sphere of influence before the Pannonian War (12-9 BCE) in which they fought against the Romans in alliance with other Illyrian peoples of Dalmatia and Pannonia. After the war and the Bellum Batonianum (6-9 CE) many of the youths of the leading Amantini families were taken hostages and many young males were sold as slaves in Italy. An inscription found in Bassianae which mentions the death of the ten-year old boy Scemaes is the only inscription which directly refers to the Amantini. Scemaes, son of Liccaus from the Undia family of the Amantini has been taken hostage by the Romans most probably during the Pannonian War. Young Scemaes drowned in a river near Emona by accident. His father Liccaus and his kinsmen Loriqus and Licaios dedicated an inscription and a cenotaph to his memory.

References

Bibliography 

Illyrian tribes
Illyrian Serbia
Ancient tribes in Serbia